Franklin Herbert Lichtenwalter (March 28, 1910 – March 4, 1973) was a Republican member of the U.S. House of Representatives from Pennsylvania.

Biography
Franklin H. Lichtenwalter was born in Pen Argyl, Pennsylvania on March 28, 1910. Employed in the general insurance industry from 1933 to 1973, he served as a member of the Pennsylvania State House of Representatives from 1938 to 1947, as majority leader from 1943 to 1946 and as speaker in 1947.

Lichtenwalter was elected as a Republican to the 80th Congress by special election on September 9, 1947 to fill the vacancy caused by the death of Charles L. Gerlach, and was re-elected to the 81st Congress, serving from September 9, 1947, to January 3, 1951. He was not a candidate for renomination in 1950.

After his time in Congress, he resumed work in the insurance business and became vice president and managing director of the Pennsylvania Electric Association in Harrisburg, Pennsylvania.

References

1910 births
1973 deaths
Republican Party members of the Pennsylvania House of Representatives
Speakers of the Pennsylvania House of Representatives
People from Carbon County, Pennsylvania
Republican Party members of the United States House of Representatives from Pennsylvania
20th-century American politicians